Pervomaiske is an urban-type settlement in the Snizhne Municipality, Horlivka Raion, Donetsk Oblast of eastern Ukraine. Population:

Demographics
Native language as of the Ukrainian Census of 2001:
 Ukrainian 93.22%
 Russian 6.47%
 Hungarian 0.16%

References

Urban-type settlements in Horlivka Raion